Struan is a name of Scottish origin and may refer to:

Places
 Struan, South Australia, Australia
 Struan, Saskatchewan, Canada
 Struan, Skye, Scotland
 Struan, Perthshire, Scotland
 Struan railway station

People
Struan Dewar (born 1989), Scottish rugby player
Struan Rodger (born 1946), British actor
Struan Stevenson (born 1948), Scottish politician
Struan Sutherland (1936–2002), Australian medical researcher

Other uses
 Struan, a shipwreck of Oregon
 Struan's, a trading company in the Asian Saga novels by James Clavell
 Dirk Struan, the founder of Struan's
 Struan Michael, a variety of flat quick bread served on Michaelmas

See also
 Clan Robertson
 Clan Duncan
 List of listed buildings in Bracadale, Highland